Eva Maria Meyersson Milgrom is a Swedish-born American social scientist publishing both in economic and sociology academic journals. She received her Ph.D. from the Department of Sociology at Stockholm University in 1992.

Eva is a senior research scholar and a teacher at Stanford University, and affiliated with the Department of Sociology and Stanford Institute for Economic Policy Research, SIEPR.  She has been a visiting professor at Stanford Graduate School of Business, MIT Sloan School of Management and the Haas School of Business. She has been a visiting scholar at the Department of Sociology, Harvard University and a guest scholar at Northwestern Institute on Complex Systems (NICO), Northwestern University in November 2008. Between 1988 and 1998 Meyersson Milgrom was a research scholar at the Institute of Industrial Organization (IUI), (today IFN), Stockholm, Sweden.

Major contributions 
Dr Meyersson Milgrom's major contributions have mainly been in three areas: corporate governance (executive compensation, and the significance of ownership structure), organization and labor markets (wage-, promotion- and productivity, gender differences) and social networks (team composition, compensation of executive teams, firm performance). Dr Meyersson Milgrom has served as an expert witness on executive compensation and on board composition. She has also consulted on topics such as gender equity, how to organize for changing strategy, and the problems with ad hoc groups.

Dr Meyersson Milgrom has been teaching and developed courses such as “An International Comparison of Corporate Governance Systems” and “Global Organizations, the Matrix of Change” in countries like China, Rwanda, Sweden and United States. She has also organised workshops, developed courses and taught classes on “Labor Market Analysis of Extreme Political Violence" and on "The Dynamics of Social, Political, and Economic Institutions".

Family 
Dr Meyersson Milgrom is married to Paul R Milgrom. She is the daughter of Ulla and Per-Martin Meyerson and has a son, Erik Meyersson, a granddaughter Noomi, two step-children Elana and Joshua Thurston-Milgrom and a step-grandson Shepherd Thurston-Milgrom.

Selected published articles
 2012 The Brokerage
 2011 Demons in the System
 2010 Cohort Effects in Promotion and Wages
 2007 Distributive Justice and CEO Compensation
 2006 The Gender Productivity Gap
 2006 The Glass Ceiling in the United States and Sweden: Lessons from the Family Friendly Corner of the World, 1970 to 1990
 2003 Corporate Governance and Structural Change. European Challenges
 2003 The Within-Job Gender Wage Gap, Sweden 1970–1990 2001 Pay, Risk and Productivity
 2000 Equal Pay for Equal Work? Evidence from Sweden, Norway and the U.S
 1999 More Glory and Less Injustice: The Glass-Ceiling in Sweden 1970–1990
 1998 Finns det ett glastak för kvinnor? En studie av svenska arbetsplatser i privat näringsliv 1970–1990
 1997 Lika lön för lika arbete. En studie av svenska förhållanden i internationell belysning
 1997  Är lönediskriminering en myt? En internationell jämförelse av lönediskriminering av kvinnor
 1997 Är kvinnor utsatta för lönediskriminering? Kompensationskontrakt för ledningsgrupper i svenska börsnoterade företag. 1995 
 1994 Human capital, Social Capital and Compensation. The impact of social networks on managers’ income
 1993  Kontrollmöjligheter i fall av asymmetrisk information. Två fallstudier: Riksbanken och husläkarsystemet
 1993  The Impact of Financial and Social Capital On Firm Performance
 1992  Doctoral Thesis The Impact of Ownership Structure and Executive Team Composition on Firm Performance The resolution of a leadership paradox

Books
 Ägarmakt och omvandling. Den svenska modellen utmanad, Ed Hans Tson Söderstrom, Ekonomirådsrapport 2003 Stockholm:SNS English summary, The Swedish Corporate Governance System, and the European Challenge. 
 Staten och bolagskapitalet om aktiv styrning av statliga bolag, 'State as a corporate owner' with Susanne Lindh, Document ID: Ds 1998:64
 Kompensationssystem i svenska börsnoterade företag, 'Compensation contracts in Swedish publicly traded firms' 1994 Almqvist och Wicksell, .5

References

External links 
 Official website of Eva M Meyersson Milgrom.

Academic staff of Stockholm University
Swedish Jews
Living people
Swedish women academics
Stanford University faculty
American women academics
Year of birth missing (living people)
21st-century American women